The Last Ten Days is a 1955 Austrian-German drama film directed by G. W. Pabst. It was the first film in post-World War II Germany to feature the character of Adolf Hitler. It follows him and others in what were the last days of the Third Reich.

It was shot at the Sievering Studios in Vienna and at Baden bei Wien. The film's sets were designed by the art directors Otto Pischinger, Wolf Witzemann and Werner Schlichting.

Cast
 Albin Skoda as Adolf Hitler
 Oskar Werner as Hauptmann Wüst
 Lotte Tobisch as Eva Braun
 Willy Krause as Joseph Goebbels
 Erich Stuckmann as Heinrich Himmler
 Erland Erlandsen as Albert Speer
 Curt Eilers as Martin Bormann
 Leopold Hainisch as Generalfeldmarschall Wilhelm Keitel
 Otto Schmöle as Generaloberst Alfred Jodl
 Herbert Herbe as General Hans Krebs
 Hannes Schiel as SS-Obersturmbannführer Otto Günsche
 Erik Frey as General Wilhelm Burgdorf
 Otto Wögerer as Generalfeldmarschall Robert Ritter von Greim
 Martha Wallner as Frieda, Kantineurin

See also
 Hitler: The Last Ten Days, a 1973 film
 The Death of Adolf Hitler 1968 book by Soviet journalist Lev Bezymenski
 The Death of Adolf Hitler (Sunday Night Theatre episode) (1973), a British television film
 The Bunker (1981 film), a CBS television film
 Downfall (2004 film) German production

References

External links
 

1955 films
1950s war films
1950s biographical films
1950s German-language films
Austrian war films
German war films
Austrian biographical films
German biographical films
West German films
Films about Adolf Hitler
Films about the Battle of Berlin
Austrian black-and-white films
German black-and-white films
Films directed by G. W. Pabst
Cultural depictions of Adolf Hitler
Cultural depictions of Joseph Goebbels
Cultural depictions of Eva Braun
Cultural depictions of Hermann Göring
Cultural depictions of Heinrich Himmler
Cultural depictions of Albert Speer
Austrian World War II films
Films shot at Sievering Studios
1950s German films